Sportsheets International, Inc., nicknamed Sportsheets (after its first product), is an international sex toy manufacturer headquartered in Huntington Beach, California, United States. The company was founded in 1993. Sportsheets manufactures and sells bondage and sex products with a product line with over 300 specialty items.

History
The company Sportsheets International, Inc. grew from a single product, the Sportsheet. In the mid-1980s, Tom Stewart saw David Letterman stick to a Velcro wall. Having run the idea of being stuck to Velcro during sex by friends and their wives and girlfriends, Tom discovered something else. Most women would try it if they were able to get themselves free. Soon Tom spoke with a representative at Velcro and spoke about his idea. The representative gave him some sample material, and with the help of a friend that was a seamstress, had a bed sheet made out of the material. After many attempts at finding a way to stick a person to the sheet, Tom and his brother came up with the idea of using Anchor Pads and Velcro Cuffs. The Velcro Cuffs could be hooked onto the Anchor Pads, and the Anchor Pads would stick to the sheets. The anchor pads can hold a person to the bed, but can be removed if pulled from the corners.

Since 1993, Sportsheets International, Inc. has helped couples to explore new expressions of their sexuality and open up to exciting experiences together. For more than 25 years, they have empowered couples to seek more intimate connections and deeper levels of understanding each other. Their ever evolving catalog of adult products has provided partners the freedom to explore the boundaries of their sensuality.

The original Sportsheet became a worldwide phenomenon, especially among women who liked the comfort of knowing that it is easy to get out of at any point during play. 

In 1999, Tom brought his sister, Julie Stewart, on board as president to lead business operations, and the two have watched the company grow from a small business run out of Tom's garage to a large global corporation that was twice named to the Inc. 5000 fastest-growing companies. More than 25 years into the business, the Sportsheets team's mission remains the same: Empowering people to fully explore their sexuality while keeping partners connected. Updated versions of the Sportsheet continue to be among the company's bestseller item.

References

Sex toy manufacturers